The women's marathon event at the 2014 Asian Games was held on 2 October on the streets of Incheon, South Korea with the finish at the Incheon Asiad Main Stadium. Eunice Kirwa from Bahrain won the gold medal.

Schedule
All times are Korea Standard Time (UTC+09:00)

Records

Results 
Legend
DNS — Did not start

References

Final results

Marathon women
2014 women
2014 Asian Games
Asian
2014 Asian Games